Sean McLean (born March 23, 1992) is an American sprinter who specializes in the 100 and 200 metres. He graduated from the Word of God Christian Academy in Raleigh, North Carolina, after previously attending Southeast Raleigh Magnet High School.

McLean won a silver medal in the 200 metres, and a gold medal in the 4×100 metres relay at the 2011 Pan American Junior Athletics Championships in Miramar, Florida. He was an All-USA high school track and field team selection by USA Today in 2010, and 2011. Mclean turned professional out of high school, turning down offers from some of the top track and field programs in the country.

Coach Kesrick Fraser was instrumental in guiding Sean from high school and through all of his professional career. Kesrick Fraser was an outstanding  sprinter at NYIT.  He was inducted in the NYIT  Hall of Fame  class of 2011.

References

External links

DyeStat profile for Sean McLean

1992 births
Living people
Track and field athletes from Raleigh, North Carolina
American male sprinters
Pan American Games medalists in athletics (track and field)
Pan American Games gold medalists for the United States
Athletes (track and field) at the 2015 Pan American Games
Medalists at the 2015 Pan American Games